Platystomos is a genus  of beetles belonging to the family Anthribidae.

Species
The genus contains at least 18 species:
 Platystomos albinus
 Platystomos andamanensis
 Platystomos cillius
 Platystomos daimio
 Platystomos desertus
 Platystomos frontalis
 Platystomos haplosoma
 Platystomos macrocerus
 Platystomos malaicus
 Platystomos ornaticollis
 Platystomos philippinensis
 Platystomos planatus
 Platystomos sellatus
 Platystomos subpenicillatus
 Platystomos tenuicornis
 Platystomos thierriati
 Platystomos uniformis
 Platystomos wallacei

References 

Anthribidae
Weevil genera